"That's the Way" is a song written by Annie Roboff and Holly Lamar, and recorded by American country music singer Jo Dee Messina.  It was released in May 2000 as lead-off single for her album Burn. The song spent four weeks at the top of the Hot Country Singles & Tracks (now Hot Country Songs), and was her highest-peaking single on the Billboard Hot 100 where it reached No. 25.

Critical reception
Deborah Evans Price of Billboard magazine reviewed the song favorably, saying that Messina "injects personality galore" into this song. She goes on to call the production, "sonically ambitious, featuring neat percussive elements, tempo changes, and those heavy, layered vocals that Nashville producers are so fond of, these days."

Music video
The music video was directed by Thom Oliphant and premiered in mid-2000. It features Messina performing the song from various colored rooms, both solo and joined by backup dancers. Messina and others are also shown throughout the video climbing the walls and ceiling of the rooms, appearing to defy gravity.

Track listings
U.S. CD Single
 "That's the Way" - 3:23
 "Even God Must Get the Blues" - 3:52

UK CD Single
 "That's the Way" - 3:21
 "Stand Beside Me" - 3:41

UK Promo CD Single
 "That's the Way" (UK Radio Remix) - 3:21

Chart performance
"That's the Way" debuted at No. 50 on the U.S. Billboard Hot Country Singles & Tracks for the week of May 20, 2000.

Peak positions

End of year charts

References

2000 singles
2000 songs
Jo Dee Messina songs
Songs written by Holly Lamar
Song recordings produced by Byron Gallimore
Song recordings produced by Tim McGraw
Curb Records singles
Songs written by Annie Roboff